Abdo Hakim ( Lebanese)is a Lebanese actor and voice actor.

Filmography

Film
Warshots. 1996

Television

Plays 
All of it by Head. 2013

Dubbing roles 

 Adventure Time - Finn the Human (the third season and beyond)
 Baby Looney Tunes - Floyd Minton
 Bakugan: Mechtanium Surge - Dan Kuso
 The Basketeers - Rudy Targui
 Ben 10: Alien Force - Ben Tennyson, Albedo, Big Chill, Spidermonkey
 Ben 10: Ultimate Alien - Ben Tennyson, Omnitrix, Albedo, Big Chill, Spidermonkey, Fasttrack, Jury Rigg, Goop
 Ben 10/Generator Rex: Heroes United - Ben Tennyson
 Ben 10: Omniverse - Ben Tennyson
 Codename: Kids Next Door - Numbuh Two (Image Production House version)
 Contraplus - Basile Landouye
 Courage the Cowardly Dog - Courage
 Dave the Barbarian - The Dark Lord Chuckles the Silly Piggy
 Dexter's Laboratory - Mandark
 Ed, Edd n Eddy - Jonny, Rolf
 Extreme Football - Samy
 Fillmore! - Joseph Anza
 Foster's Home for Imaginary Friends - Wilt
 The Grim Adventures of Billy & Mandy - Billy
 The Jetsons - Elroy Jetson
 Kim Possible - Felix Renton, Prince Wally
 The Marvelous Misadventures of Flapjack - Flapjack
 Mokhtarnameh
 Over the Garden Wall - Wirt
 Pac-Man and the Ghostly Adventures - Spiralton
 Pokémon : James (the third season and beyond), Max
 Prophet Joseph - Young Mimisaboo (uncredited)
 Puppy in My Pocket: Adventures in Pocketville - Magic
 Rekkit Rabbit - Jay Shmufton
 The Smurfs - Clumsy Smurf (Image Production House version)
 Teen Titans - Beast Boy
 Teen Titans Go! - Beast Boy
 Teletubbies - Tinky-Winky, Dipsy

 Yin Yang Yo! - Yang
 Yu-Gi-Oh! Duel Monsters - Yugi Mutou, Yami Yugi
 Yu-Gi-Oh! GX - Chazz Princeton
 Looped - Lucas Maxwell (1nd Voice)

References

External links 

1973 births
Lebanese male actors
Lebanese male voice actors
Living people
Place of birth missing (living people)
21st-century Lebanese male actors
Lebanese male stage actors
Lebanese male television actors